The Casey Award has been given to the best baseball book of the year since 1983. The award was begun by Mike Shannon and W.J. Harrison, editors and co-founders of Spitball: The Literary Baseball Magazine.

Casey Award recipients
1983 – Eric Rolfe Greenberg, for The Celebrant
1984 – Peter Golenbock, for Bums: An Oral History of the Brooklyn Dodgers
1985 – Roger Kahn, for Good Enough to Dream
1986 – Bill James, for The Bill James Historical Baseball Abstract
1987 – Peter H. Gordon, for Diamonds Are Forever
1988 – John Holway, for Blackball Stars
1989 – Mike Sowell, for The Pitch That Killed
1990 – , for Baseball: The People’s Game
1991 – Bruce Kuklick, for To Everything a Season: Shibe Park and Urban Philadelphia, 1909-1976
1992 – Phil S. Dixon, for The Negro Baseball Leagues: A Photographic History
1993 – Michael Gershman, for Diamonds: the Evolution of the Ballpark
1994 – John Helyar, for Lords of the Realm
1995 – Henry W. Thomas, for Walter Johnson: Baseball's Big Train
1996 – Marty Appel, for Slide, Kelly, Slide
1997 – Thomas Dyja, for Play for a Kingdom
1998 – David Pietrusza, for Judge and Jury: The Life and Times of Judge Kenesaw Mountain Landis
1999 – Neal Karlen, for Slouching Toward Fargo
2000 – Reed Browning, for Cy Young: A Baseball Life
2001 – Tom Stanton, for The Final Season
2002 – Howard Bryant, for Shut Out: A Story of Race and Baseball in Boston
2003 – Michael Lewis, for Moneyball: The Art of Winning an Unfair Game
2004 – Leigh Montville, for Ted Williams: The Biography of an American Hero
2005 – Jonathan Eig, for Luckiest Man: The Life and Death of Lou Gehrig
2006 – Peter Morris, for Game of Inches
2007 – Joe Posnanski, for The Soul of Baseball: A Road Trip Through Buck O'Neil's America
2008 – Kadir Nelson, for We are the Ship: The Story of Negro League Baseball
2009 – Larry Tye, for Satchel: The Life and Times of an American Legend
2010 – Howard Bryant, for The Last Hero: A Life of Henry Aaron
2011 – Kostya Kennedy, for 56: Joe DiMaggio and the Last Magic Number in Sports
2012 – Paul Dickson, for Bill Veeck: Baseball's Greatest Maverick
2013 – Herschel Cobb, for Heart of a Tiger: Growing Up with My Grandfather, Ty Cobb
2014 - Kostya Kennedy, for Pete Rose: An American Dilemma
2015 - Charles Leerhsen, for Ty Cobb: A Terrible Beauty
2016 - Michael Leahy, for The Last Innocents: The Collision of the Turbulent Sixties and the Los Angeles Dodgers
2017 – Marty Appel, for Casey Stengel: Baseball's Greatest Character
2018 – Rob Neyer, for Power Ball: Anatomy of a Modern Baseball Game
2019 - Jeremy Beer, for Oscar Charleston: The Life and Legend of Baseball's Greatest Forgotten Player
 2020 - Thomas Gilbert, for How Baseball Happened
 2021 – Joe Posnanski, for The Baseball 100

See also

Jerry Malloy Book Prize (SABR)
Seymour Medal (SABR)
Baseball America#Best baseball books
Baseball awards#Baseball book of the year
:Category:Baseball books
List of literary awards#Sports
List of sports journalism awards

References

Further reading

External links
Casey Award. Spitball: The Literary Baseball Magazine website.
Casey Award Winners by Spitball Magazine. Baseball Almanac.
The Casey Award. Roy Kaplan's Baseball Bookshelf.

Baseball trophies and awards

Sports writing awards
Awards established in 1983